This is a list of fictional characters from DC Comics who are or have been enemies of Green Lantern.

Golden Age enemies of Alan Scott

Silver Age enemies of Hal Jordan

Modern Age enemies

Villains from comics in other media

See also 
List of Batman family enemies
List of Superman enemies
List of Wonder Woman enemies
List of Aquaman enemies
List of Flash enemies
Rogues

References 

Green Lantern characters
 
Lists of DC Comics characters
Lists of DC Comics supervillains